The 2022 Eastleigh Borough Council election took place on 5 May 2022 to elect councillors to Eastleigh Borough Council.

Results summary

Ward results

Bishopstoke

Botley

Bursledon & Hound North

Chandler's Ford

Eastleigh Central

Eastleigh North

Eastleigh South

Fair Oak & Horton Heath

Hamble & Netley

Hedge End North

Hedge End South

Hiltingbury

West End North

West End South

References

2022
Eastleigh
2020s in Hampshire